George James McEachran (born 30 August 2000) is an English professional footballer who plays as a midfielder for Swindon Town. He is the younger brother of fellow footballer Josh McEachran.

Club career
McEachran was an unused substitute for Chelsea in the 2019 UEFA Europa League Final. The following season, he spent a short time on loan at SC Cambuur in the Dutch second division. 

In this 2020–21 season, McEachran returned to the Netherlands with MVV Maastricht on a season-long loan. In December 2020, he ended his loan prematurely for 'compelling private reasons'.

In February 2023 he signed for Swindon Town.

International career
McEachran was a member of the England U17s side that finished runners-up at the 2017 UEFA European Under-17 Championship - scoring in a 4-0 group stage victory over Ukraine and going on to be named in the team of the tournament. McEachran and that Young Lions squad would go on to better that achievement later that year by winning the 2017 FIFA U-17 World Cup in India.

Honours
England U17
FIFA U-17 World Cup: 2017
UEFA European Under-17 Championship runner-up: 2017

Chelsea
UEFA Europa League: 2018–19

Individual
UEFA European Under-17 Championship Team of the Tournament: 2017

Career statistics

Club

References

2000 births
Living people
Footballers from Oxford
English footballers
English expatriate footballers
Chelsea F.C. players
SC Cambuur players
MVV Maastricht players
Swindon Town F.C. players
Eerste Divisie players
Association football midfielders
England youth international footballers
English expatriate sportspeople in the Netherlands
Expatriate footballers in the Netherlands